Daddy's Home is the sixth album by emcee, Big Daddy Kane. It is Big Daddy Kane's only album on MCA Records, released in September 13, 1994. Like his previous album Looks Like a Job For…, Daddy's Home was generally well-received, but lacked in sales. Despite the positive reviews, the album saw a large drop in Kane's commercial popularity, and produced no crossover hit singles, like 1993's "Very Special".

The album features the singles "In the PJ's" and the DJ Premier-produced posse cut "Show & Prove", featuring Ol' Dirty Bastard, Shyheim, Sauce Money and a then-unknown Jay Z (credited as "J.Z."), who, at the time, was Kane's protégé. Kane's longtime producer Easy Mo Bee produced three songs on Daddy's Home and was set to bring in a fourth song for the album. However, Kane rejected it. Easy Mo Bee later gave the track to the Notorious B.I.G., which he would use for the song "Warning" for his 1994 debut Ready To Die.

Following the release of Daddy's Home, Kane took a long break from music, until returning four years later with his seventh album Veteranz Day.

Track listing

Charts

Album

Singles

References

Big Daddy Kane albums
1994 albums
MCA Records albums
Albums produced by Easy Mo Bee
Albums produced by Big Daddy Kane
Albums produced by DJ Premier